The Staff Secretary ("Staff Sec") is a position in the White House Office responsible for managing paper flow to the President and circulating documents among senior staff for comment. It has been referred to as "the nerve center of the White House." Specifically, the Office of the Staff Secretary decides which decision memos, briefing materials, lists of potential nominees, briefing books, intelligence reports, schedules, correspondence, and speech drafts end up on the president’s desk, as well as how and when the president will receive them. The Staff Secretary also works with senior White House staff to edit all of these materials and ensure they are ready for the president's consumption. 

The Office of the Staff Secretary is generally composed of a Staff Secretary, a Deputy Staff Secretary, and several Associate Staff Secretaries. The Office of the Staff Secretary, along with its sub-offices—the Office of the Executive Clerk, the Office of Records Management, and the Office of Presidential Correspondence—is the largest of the White House Offices.

The current Staff Secretary is Neera Tanden, who also holds the title of Senior Advisor to the President.

Function

Due to the high volume of important memos, meetings and decisions generated for the President's attention, the Staff Secretary is tasked with deciding which papers should go to the President's desk—and when the paper should be sent to him.  These documents range from presidential decision memos and bills passed by Congress to drafts of speeches and samples of correspondence.  The Staff Secretary relies on close coordination with Oval Office Operations and the Scheduling Office to decide when and how the President would like to receive documents.

The Staff Secretary's principal role is to review the incoming papers and determine which issues must reach the President.  Secondary to this, Staff Sec determines who else in the administration should comment on the issue to give the President a full picture of the situation.  Staff Sec then compiles the documents with the relevant commentary for the President's consumption.

Traditionally, the Staff Secretary is a position of great trust due to the influence it can wield over which information is allowed to reach the President, and who is given the opportunity to comment on those issues.

The Staff Secretary or a designated Assistant Staff Secretary always accompanies the President on any work-related travel.

History
The position was established under President Dwight D. Eisenhower in 1953, one of the recommendations of the Hoover Commission (Commission on the Organization of the Executive Branch).  Under Eisenhower, the first staff secretaries focused particularly on screening national security communications; in this role, Colonel Andrew J. Goodpaster was thought to overshadow the President's special assistant for national security.

With the appointment of businessman Jon Huntsman, Sr., as Staff Secretary in the Richard Nixon White House, the role was vastly expanded to absorb the functions of the Office of Management and Administration.  These new roles included personnel management, finance and operations, services (such as access to the White House Mess and limousine fleet), facilities and furniture, and oversight of the Executive Clerk and Visitors Office.

Almost all of these responsibilities—as well as Presidential Correspondence—were spun off during the Carter Administration into the newly created Office of Administration.

During the Reagan Administration the Offices of the Staff Secretary and the Executive Clerk were reunited with Presidential Correspondence in a configuration that has remained fairly consistent through the subsequent presidencies.

President Trump's second White House Chief of Staff, John F. Kelly, reiterated the importance of the role of the Staff Secretary in managing the flow of information around the White House. His decision to allow a Staff Secretary with only an interim security clearance has been criticized.

List of Staff Secretaries

References

External links
 AmericanPresident.org description of position
Description of creation of staff secretary position
 List of officeholders
Records of the White House Office of the Staff Secretary, Dwight D. Eisenhower Presidential Library

Presidency of the United States
Staff Secretary